Leinan is a locality in Saskatchewan Landing Rural Municipality No. 167 in the province of Saskatchewan, Canada. It is located east of highway 4 on Township Road 175 (Leinan Road), approximately 24 km north of Swift Current.

See also
 List of communities in Saskatchewan
 List of ghost towns in Saskatchewan

References

Unincorporated communities in Saskatchewan
Saskatchewan Landing No. 167